Tomaszowo  is a village in the administrative district of Gmina Żagań, within Żagań County, Lubusz Voivodeship, in western Poland.

References

Tomaszowo